Epimesosa taliana is a species of beetle in the family Cerambycidae, and the only species in the genus Epimesosa. It was described by Pic in 1917.

References

Mesosini
Beetles described in 1917